The Constitution of the Republic of Chad is the supreme law of Chad. Chad's eighth constitution since independence from France, it was adopted on 4 May 2018.

The text establishes the Fourth Republic within the framework of a presidential regime, abolishing the post of Prime Minister. It replaces the 1996 Constitution.

2021 suspension 
In April 2021, the Transitional Military Council suspended the Constitution. In its place, it issued a charter, which granted General Mahamat Déby the powers of the Presidency as interim president and named him head of the armed forces.

References

External links 

 Constitution of Chad 

Law of Chad
Constitutions by country
Government of Chad